Ovie Soko (born 7 February 1991) is a British professional basketball player for the London Lions of the British Basketball League (BBL) and the EuroCup. Soko played college basketball for the University of Alabama at Birmingham and Duquesne University. He entered the 2014 NBA draft but he was not selected in the draft's two rounds. Soko is of Nigerian heritage on both his paternal and maternal sides.

In 2019, he joined the fifth series of British reality show Love Island. He placed third in the show.

High school career
Soko attended at the Bethel High School in Hampton, Virginia where he averaged 14.5 points, 7.5 rebounds, 4.0 assists and 1.0 blocks per game during his lone season. He led the team field goal percentage (60%) and lead the Bruins to a 23-4 overall mark and district championship (16-2) as a senior As a junior, Soko played at Hampton Roads Academy where he averaged 17.1 points, 8.6 rebounds, 2.3 steals and 1.5 blocks per game.

College career

Alabama-Birmingham
In his freshman season at UAB, Soko played in 28 games with six starts as a true freshman. He averaged 1.5 points and 1.9 rebounds.

In his sophomore season, Soko played in 30 games with 29 starts being one of UAB's most improved players, averaging 9.1 points and 5.8 rebounds per game. He ranked second on the team in rebounding, field goal percentage (.505) and blocked shots (26) and closed the year by averaging 10.9 points and 6.1 rebounds while shooting 59.0 percent from the floor (33-of-56) over the Blazers final eight games.

In his junior season, he played in 30 games with 24 starts, averaging 8.3 points and 6.8 rebounds per game and led the team with 28 steals tied for second with 51 assists. He also changed from jersey number 32 to number 0 prior to the season.

Duquesne
In his senior season, Soko transferred to Duquesne where he started in all 30 games averaging a team-high 18.4 and 8.0 rebounds per game. He became the first Duquesne player since Bryant McAllister (19.7 ppg. in 2006) and seventh player in Duquesne history to lead the Atlantic 10 in scoring (18.4 ppg.). He was the only Atlantic 10 player ranked in the Top 10 in scoring and rebounding as well as the only forward ranked among the Atlantic 10's top 12 scorers.

Professional career

Boulazac
Soko went undrafted in the 2014 NBA draft. On 2 August 2014 he signed a one-year deal with Boulazac Dordogneof the LNB Pro B.

Aries Trikala
On 24 August 2015 he signed with Aries Trikala of Greece for the 2015–16 season. He appeared in 19 games for Aries Trikala, averaging 16.5 points, 7.9 rebounds, 2.6 assists and 1.9 steals per game. On 10 April he signed a one-month deal with Enel Brindisi of the Serie A.

Murcia
On 5 August 2016 Soko joined UCAM Murcia of the Liga ACB. During the season, he averaged 6.3 points and 3.2 rebounds per game. On 1 July 2017 he renewed his contract for another season with Murcia. With Murcia, Soko played at the Champions League where he averaged 13 points and 7.4 rebounds per game, and he was named to the Basketball Champions League Star Lineup. On 11 July 2018 Soko re-signed with UCAM Murcia of the Liga ACB.

London Lions
On 20 November 2019 Soko signed with London Lions. He averaged 20.2 points and 8.2 rebounds per game.

Le Mans Sarthe
On 9 July 2020 Soko signed with Le Mans Sarthe of the LNB Pro A.

London Lions 
On July 8, 2022, Soko signed with London Lions of the British BBL and the EuroCup Basketball.

Career statistics

BBL statistics

|-
| style="text-align:left;"|2019-2020]]
| style="text-align:left;"| London Lions
| 12 || 8 || 25.8 || 47.3 || 12.5 || 78 || 8.6  || 2.0 || 1.1 || 0.0 || 19.9

National team career 
Soko made his debut for the Great Britain Men's national team in a closed international test match against New Zealand on 24 July 2015. He led Great Britain to an 81–73 victory over No. 18 Germany in FIBA EuroBasket 2021 Qualifying on 24 February 2020. Soko scored 18 points and 10 rebounds.

Love Island
Soko entered the fifth series of British reality show Love Island. Soko went on to finish in third place with India Reynolds.

Modelling
Ovie announced on 26 August 2019 that he is partnering with ASOS.com along with his father, Raymond Soko, for an upcoming collection.

References

External links
RealGM.com Profile
Draftexpress.com Profile
ESPN.com Profile 
Duquesne Dukes bio
UAB Blazers bio

1991 births
Living people
Aries Trikala B.C. players
Basketball players from Greater London
British expatriate basketball people in France
British expatriate basketball people in Greece
British expatriate basketball people in Italy
British expatriate basketball people in Spain
British expatriate basketball people in the United States
British men's basketball players
British people of Nigerian descent
CB Murcia players
Duquesne Dukes men's basketball players
English men's basketball players
Le Mans Sarthe Basket players
Liga ACB players
London Lions (basketball) players
New Basket Brindisi players
People from Worcester Park
Power forwards (basketball)
UAB Blazers men's basketball players
Love Island (2015 TV series) contestants